The Fort Pitt Bridge is a steel, double-decked bowstring arch bridge that spans the Monongahela River near its confluence with the Allegheny River in Pittsburgh, Pennsylvania. It carries Interstate 376 between the Fort Pitt Tunnel and Downtown Pittsburgh. Opened in June 1959 as a replacement for the Point Bridge, the Fort Pitt Bridge was the world's first computer-designed bowstring arch bridge and double-decked bowstring arch bridge. The bridge is known for its difficult lane changes, especially on the lower level, often requiring people to go from the extreme left lane across two lanes to the extreme right lane in only 300 feet. The upper level is more forgiving for some routes, but still requires a full span lane change in 300 feet to get from the south side entrance to the downtown exits.

History
The $6.305 million Fort Pitt Bridge, designed by George S. Richardson of Richardson, Gordon, & Associates, opened at 11 a.m. on June 19, 1959 with a ribbon-cutting ceremony by Gov. David L. Lawrence before a caravan, including Mayor Thomas Gallagher and mayoral candidate Joseph M. Barr, was driven across while a city fireboat gave a hose salute upriver.  Its two predecessor bridges, the original Point Bridge (1877–1924) and its replacement of the same name (aka Point Bridge II, 1927–1959), spanned even closer to the aforementioned confluence from West Carson Street (near the Duquesne Incline) to Water St. (now Fort Pitt Blvd.), near the tip of Point State Park. The Point Bridge closed two days after the opening of the Fort Pitt Bridge, but remained standing until it was dismantled (along with the connected Manchester Bridge) in 1970.

Until the opening of the Fort Pitt Tunnels on September 1, 1960, outbound traffic was routed onto West Carson St. (PA 837 North), heading towards the West End.

At the time of opening, the bridge contained 8,066 tons of steel, 4,950 tons of structural carbon steel and 1,305 tons of steel reinforcing rods.  The contractors included U.S. Steel's American Bridge Co., John F. Casey Co., Dinardo Inc., Fort Pitt Bridge Co., and J.C. Jackanic Inc.

Popular culture
The Fort Pitt Bridge is part of a sequence from The Song Remains the Same (1976), a documentary of Led Zeppelin's 1973 tour. Many other Pittsburgh landmarks are also shown, including the Liberty Bridge and its tunnels.

It also features prominently in the 2012 film The Perks of Being a Wallflower.

The bridge also appears in the 1993 film Striking Distance and the 2011 film Abduction.

The early promotional images for The Last of Us, used this bridge as a recognizable landmark to show that the game would be partially set in and around Pittsburgh. During the game, the characters use the bridge in the distance as a landmark for their destination out of the city.

See also

 List of crossings of the Monongahela River
 Bridges of Pittsburgh
 Fort Pitt Tunnel

References

External links

Fort Pitt Bridge at PGH Bridges.com

Bridges in Pittsburgh
Bridges over the Monongahela River
U.S. Route 22
U.S. Route 30
Bridges completed in 1959
Double-decker bridges
Tied arch bridges in the United States
Road bridges in Pennsylvania
Interstate 76 (Ohio–New Jersey)
U.S. Route 19
Bridges on the Interstate Highway System
Bridges of the United States Numbered Highway System
Steel bridges in the United States